"Electronic Battle Weapon" is a series of promotional records by The Chemical Brothers made for DJs to test in clubs. The songs have been used as tracks in several albums as well as B-sides of other singles. The greatest hits album "Brotherhood" reprints Electronic Battle Weapon 1 through to 10 as part of disc 2.

Singles

References

The Chemical Brothers songs